is a former Japanese football player.

Club statistics

References

External links

j-league

1984 births
Living people
Momoyama Gakuin University alumni
Association football people from Hiroshima Prefecture
Japanese footballers
J2 League players
Japan Football League players
FC Gifu players
Fagiano Okayama players
Association football defenders